Macrodactylus angustatus is a species of scarab beetle in the family Scarabaeidae. It is found in North America. A yellow beetle with an elongate shape and long legs, it is 7-10mm long, and may be found on shrubs. Its range is Massachusetts to Indiana in the north, and south to Florida and Texas.

References

Further reading

 

Melolonthinae
Articles created by Qbugbot
Beetles described in 1805